Bellamya constricta is a species of freshwater snail with a gill and an operculum, an aquatic gastropod mollusc in the family Viviparidae.

This snail is found in Kenya, Tanzania, and Uganda. Its natural habitat is freshwater lakes. It is threatened by habitat loss.

References

Viviparidae
Taxa named by Eduard von Martens
Taxonomy articles created by Polbot